George Holmes was an English-born Anglican bishop in Canada from 1905 to 1912.

Holmes was born in Kendal, Westmorland on 23 November 1858 and ordained in 1887 after which he was a Church Mission Society (CMS) missionary in the Northwest Territories.  In 1901 he became Archdeacon of Athabasca and four years later was ordained to the episcopate as the Bishop of Moosonoe. He was translated to the Diocese of Athabasca in 1909. He died on 3 February 1912.

References

1858 births
People from Kendal
Anglican archdeacons in North America
Anglican bishops of Moosonee
Anglican bishops of Athabasca
20th-century Anglican Church of Canada bishops
1912 deaths